The Faculty of Physician Associates (FPA) at the Royal College of Physicians (RCP) is the professional membership body for physician associates (PAs) in the United Kingdom. Established in 2015, it is responsible for setting PA standards, running the accreditation examinations, and also manages the Physician Associate Managed Voluntary Register (PAMVR). It is a faculty of the RCP. The president of the organisation as of 2022 is Jamie Saunders who works in haematology at Guy's and St Thomas' NHS Foundation Trust and its vice-president is Chandran Louis who works in urology at St George's University Hospitals NHS Foundation Trust.

References

Health care occupations
Royal College of Physicians